GE-2, called AMC-2 after 2001, is a privately owned American communications satellite launched in 1997. It was the first of the GE series to be launched outside the United States. It was launched by an Ariane 44L on 30 January 1997 at 22:04:00 UTC, flying from ELA-2, Centre Spatial Guyanais alongside another satellite, Nahuel 1A. It was owned by GE Americom until 2001 when the company was sold to SES (Société Européenne des Satellites). The name of the spacecraft was then changed by SES Americom to AMC-2 in 2001.

Overview 
GE-2 carries 24 Ku-band and 24 C-band transponders. It is stationed at approximately 81° West serving the North America. There is also a plan to relocate the satellite to 85° West orbital position. It is powered by two deployable solar panels which charge the batteries. It uses LEROS-1c engines for propulsion.

References

External links 
 AMC-2 (SES.com)

SES satellites
Communications satellites in geostationary orbit
AMC-02
Spacecraft launched in 1997